Muzika means music in Slavonic languages. It may refer to:

People 
 František Muzika (1900–1974), Czech avant-garde painter and artist 
 Yuri Muzika (born 1980), Azerbaijani footballer

Film 
 Music (2008 film) or Muzika, a Slovak film

See also 
 Muzika Poludelih, a Serbian punk band
 Muzika na struju, a studio album from Serbian rock band Bajaga i Instruktori
 Mutato Muzika, an American music production company
 Narodna muzika, folk music in the South Slavic languages
 Starogradska muzika, an urban traditional folk music of eastern Europe